Leopold Adolph Emile Reise, Sr. (June 1, 1892 – July 8, 1975) was a Canadian hockey player who played 8 seasons in the National Hockey League for the Hamilton Tigers, New York Americans and New York Rangers. Prior to turning professional in 1920 he played several years for the amateur Hamilton Tigers, joining the professional version when they started and staying for four seasons. He also spent three seasons with the Saskatoon Crescents of the Western Canada Hockey League, and returned to the NHL in 1926 with the New York Americans, spending four seasons with them before finishing his time in the NHL with the New York Rangers. Reise spent two additional seasons in the minor International Hockey League before retiring in 1932. His son, Leo Reise, Jr., would also play in the NHL.

Personal life
Reise was born in Pembroke, Ontario. He lost sight in one of his eyes as a youngster, yet he continued to play hockey. The loss did not come as a result of an injury but rather as the result of an optical nerve that simply died.

His son Leo Reise, Jr. won the Stanley Cup twice with the Detroit Red Wings, in 1950 and 1952.

Career statistics

Regular season and playoffs

Awards and achievements
OHA-Sr. Second All-Star Team (1918, 1921)
OHA-Sr. First All-Star Team (1920)

External links

1892 births
1975 deaths
Canadian ice hockey defencemen
Hamilton Tigers (ice hockey) players
Ice hockey people from Ontario
London Tecumsehs players
New York Americans players
New York Rangers players
Pittsburgh Hornets players
Pittsburgh Yellow Jackets (IHL) players
Saskatoon Sheiks players
Sportspeople from Pembroke, Ontario
Sportspeople with a vision impairment